The FIBA Asia Under-20 Championship 2004 is the 4th edition of the FIBA Asia's young men championship for basketball. The games were held at Tehran, Iran

Qualification
According to the FIBA Asia rules, each zone had two places, and the hosts (Iran) and holders (Qatar) were automatically qualified. The other four places are allocated to the zones according to performance in the 2000 ABC Under-20 Championship.

Draw

* Withdrew

Preliminary round

Group A

Group B

Group C

Group D

Quarterfinals

Group I

Group II

Group III

Group IV

Classification 9th–14th

13th place

11th place

9th place

Classification 5th–8th

Semifinals

7th place

5th place

Final round

Semifinals

3rd place

Final

Final standing

Awards

References
Japan Basketball Association

FIBA Asia Under-20 Championship
2004–05 in Asian basketball
2004–05 in Iranian basketball
International basketball competitions hosted by Iran